Guevara is a surname of Basque origin. Notable people with the surname include:

 Amado Guevara (born 1976), Honduran football (soccer) player
 Álvaro Guevara (1894–1951), Chilean painter
 Ander Guevara (born 1997), Spanish footballer for Real Sociedad 
 Ángel Aníbal Guevara (born 1924), Guatemalan politician
 Antonio de Guevara (c. 1481 – 1545), Spanish chronicler and moralist
 Armando Guevara (born 1955), Venezuelan boxer
 Ernesto "Che" Guevara (1928–1967), Argentine Marxist revolutionary
 Diego de Guevara (c. 1450 – 1520), Spanish diplomat and art collector
 Ena Guevara (born 1959), Peruvian long-distance runner
 Felipe de Guevara (died 1563), Spanish humanist
 Fernando Niño de Guevara (1541–1609), Spanish cardinal
 Gerardo Guevara (born 1930), Ecuadorian composer
 Giomar Guevara (born 1972), Major League Baseball shortstop  who played for the Seattle Mariners
 Hermógenes Leonel Guevara Mora (born 1979), Nicaraguan poet
 Hilda Guevara, Peruvian congresswoman
 Íñigo Vélez de Guevara, Count consort of Oñate (1566–1644), Spanish diplomat and politician
 Isabel de Guevara (1530–1556), Spanish colonial chief
 Jesús Guevara (born 1969), Venezuelan heavyweight boxer
 Luis Vélez de Guevara (1579 – 1644), Spanish dramatist and novelist
 Manuel Guevara (born 1969), Venezuelan road cyclist
 Otto Guevara (born 1960), Costa Rican libertarian politician
 Tomás Guevara (1865–1935), Chilean historian, teacher and Mapuche scholar

Basque-language surnames